Desmond Robert Fell (16 December 1912 – 22 January 1992) was a South African cricketer who played first-class cricket in for Natal either side of the Second World War, later becoming an umpire. He was born in Pietermaritzburg, and died aged 79 in Durban.

His most successful season was 1946–47, when he scored 496 first-class runs at 49.60, including two centuries, the higher of these being the career-best 161 he hit against Rhodesia. He also passed 400 runs in 1937–38, but after that his highest aggregate was the 219 runs he accumulated in 1947–48.

Fell's only first-class match outside South Africa was the game he played for Dominions against England at Lord's in late August 1945; he made 12 and 28 in what was the first first-class match to be played in England after the war.

After his retirement from playing, Fell umpired 15 first-class matches in the 1950s and 1960s, almost all involving Natal. The two exceptions were the first Test between South Africa and New Zealand at Durban in 1961–62, and a non-Test game between a South African XI and the Australians at Pietermaritzburg in 1966–67.

External links
 

1912 births
1992 deaths
South African cricketers
KwaZulu-Natal cricketers
South African Test cricket umpires
Alumni of Maritzburg College
Dominions cricketers